Hands Up! is a 2000 Telugu film directed by Siva Nageswara Rao from a story written by Jayasudha. It stars Jayasudha, Bramhanandam, Nagendra Babu and Kota Srinivasa Rao.

Plot 
Cops Nagababu and Brahmanandam fall for their newly transferred senior police official. In an interesting plot sequence, they fall head over heels in love. While fighting for love and against the goons, they learn she is married (to Chiranjeevi in cameo).

Cast 
 Jayasudha as CBI officer Saraswati
 Brahmanandam as Jagan
 Nagendra Babu as Muddu Krishna
 Kota Srinivasa Rao as Ramakoti
 Rallapalli
 Chandra Mohan
 Giri Babu
 Tanikella Bharani as Translator
 Y. Vijaya
 Sonu Sood as Tuglaq
 Master Varun as Varun
 Cameo appearances
 Chiranjeevi as Saraswati's husband
 Nagma as an item number
 Deepti Bhatnagar
 Shraddha
 Ali
 Raghava Lawrence in a Special Appearance

Soundtrack

References

External links

2000 films
2000s Telugu-language films
Films directed by Siva Nageswara Rao